P. Padmarajan (23 May 1945 – 24 January 1991) was an Indian film maker, screenwriter and author who was known for his works in Malayalam literature and Malayalam cinema. He was the founder of a new school of film making in Malayalam cinema, along with Bharathan and K. G. George, in the 1980s.

Padmarajan was known for his detailed screenwriting and expressive direction style and made some of the landmark motion pictures in Malayalam cinema. He won the Kerala Sahithya Academy Award in 1972 for his novel Nakshathrangale Kaval. He made his directorial debut in 1979 with Peruvazhiyambalam which won the National Film Award for Best Feature Film in Malayalam. He won his second National Award in 1986 with Thinkalaazhcha Nalla Divasam. Padmarajan had won six Kerala State Film Awards which includes two awards for Best Story in 1978, 1979 and two awards for Best Screenplay in 1984 and 1986. He has written screenplay for thirty seven movies among which eighteen he directed. The screenplay for all the movies he directed were written by Padmarajan himself. Njan Gandharvan was his last movie and within a week of its release, he died at Kozhikode due to sudden cardiac arrest.

Early life
Padmarajan was born on 23 May 1945 in Muthukulam near Haripad in Alappuzha, which was then under the princely state of Travancore. He was the sixth son of Thundathil Anantha Padmanabha Pillai and Njavarakkal Devaki Amma. After early schooling at Muthukulam, he studied at Mahatma Gandhi College, Thiruvananthapuram and University College, Thiruvananthapuram, graduating with a B.Sc. in chemistry (1963). Subsequently, he learned Sanskrit from the scholar Cheppad Achyutha Warrier at Muthukulam. He then joined All India Radio, Trichur (1965), starting as a programme announcer, and later settled at Poojappura, Trivandrum(1968); he would remain at All India Radio until 1986 when his involvement in films prompted him to retire voluntarily.

Career as screenwriter and director

Padmarajan's stories mainly deal with deceit, murder, romance, mystery, passion, jealousy, libertinism, anarchism, individualism, social structure, human psychology and life of peripheral elements of society. Some of them are considered among the best in Malayalam literature. The screenplay for all the movies he directed were written by Padmarajan himself. His first novel published in 1971 titled Nakshathrangale Kaaval (The Stars Alone Guard Me) won the Kerala Sahithya Academy award (1972).

He entered the world of Malayalam cinema by writing the screenplay for Prayanam (1975) which was Bharathan's directorial debut and had the cinematography by Balu Mahendra. Rappadikalude Gatha (1978) was his third movie as a screenwriter which won the Kerala State Film Award for Best Story in 1978. His next work as a screenwriter was the classic erotic film Rathinirvedam (1978) which is regarded as a landmark in Indian film history.

After writing screenplay for three more films, Padmarajan made his directional debut in 1979 with Peruvazhiyambalam (The Halfway House). It won the National Film Award for Best Feature Film in Malayalam and was included in IBN Live's list of 100 greatest Indian films of all time. His next directed Oridathoru Phayalvaan (There Lived a Wrestler) in 1981. Padmarajan also did the editing of this movie. It won the award for best script at the Kuala Lumpur International Film Festival and a gold medal at the Asian Film Festival. In 1982 he directed Novemberinte Nashtam which was critically acclaimed. Padmarajan's Koodevide? (1983) won the Kerala State Film Award for Best Film with Popular Appeal and Aesthetic Value. In 1984, he wrote the screenplay for I. V Sasi's Kanamarayathu, which won the Kerala State Film Award for Best Screenplay. In 1986 he directed Desatanakkili Karayarilla, which is one of the first Indian films that explored womance on screen. He won the second National Award with Thinkalazhcha Nalla Divasam in 1985. Padmarajan's Kariyilakkattu Pole (1986) is considered one of the classic investigative thrillers in Malayalam. The same year he directed Arappatta Kettiya Gramathil which was a failure at box office. The plot of the movie which revolves around a brothel and the sex workers in it eventually developed a cult following.

With Mohanlal and Mammootty in the lead role, Padmarajan directed some of the cult classic movies in Malayalam such as Namukku Parkkan Munthiri Thoppukal (1986), Arappatta Kettiya Gramathil (1986), Kariyilakkattu Pole (1986), Thoovanathumbikal (1987) and Season (1989). Thoovanathumbikal was ranked eighth by IBN Live in its list of greatest Indian films of all time and is considered one of the best romantic movies ever made in Malayalam. Aparan (1988) is his another classic mystery psychological thriller which also marked the acting debut of Jayaram. It won the Kerala State Film Award for Best Screenplay in 1988. Moonnam Pakkam (1988) is the another classic Padmarajan movie which was critically acclaimed. His 1990 movie Innale is mainly noted for the performance of Suresh Gopi. Padmarajan's last movie Njan Gandharvan (1991) was a failure at box office. But the film later developed a cult following because of its aesthetics and storytelling. Within a week of its release, Padmarajan died at a hotel in Kozhikode. In total Padmarajan has written screenplay for 37 films among 18 of which he directed.

Association with Bharathan
Together with Bharathan and K. G. George, he successfully laid the foundation for a school of Malayalam cinema that strove to tread a middle ground by striking a fine balance. The term "Parallel film" is usually used to describe Padmarajan's style of film making. Along with Bharathan, he displayed mastery in handling sexuality on the screen, hitherto less known in Malayalam cinema.

Association with actors
He was quite adept in spotting talent, and introduced many fresh faces who would later make their mark in Indian cinema, including Jayaram (Aparan), Ashokan (Peruvazhiyambalam), Rasheed (Oridathoru Phayalvaan), Rahman (Koodevide),   Ramachandran (Novemberinte Nashtam), Ajayan (Moonnam Pakkam). Also artists like Nitish Bharadwaj (Njan Gandharvan), Suhasini (Koodevide); Shari (Namukku Parkkan Munthirithoppukal) were introduced to Malayalam screen by him.

He coaxed sparkling and inspired performances from many actors, such as Bharath Gopi, Mammootty, Mohanlal, Jayaram, Shobana, Sumalatha, Karamana Janardanan Nair, Rahman, Jagathy Sreekumar, Suresh Gopi, Thilakan, Nedumudi Venu and Ashokan; indeed, Thilakan's rendition in Moonnam Pakkam is considered one of the best performance in his career. His association with Mohanlal and Mammootty was well noted especially because their films broke the conventional concepts prevailing during that time. He also aided in establishing, to a fair degree, the fame of other directors such as Bharathan, I. V. Sasi, and Mohan, through his association with them. His collaboration with Bharathan as a scriptwriter is considered to have produced remarkable works in Malayalam cinema. His assistants who went on to direct films independently include Thoppil Ajayan (Perumthachan), Suresh Unnithan's (Jaathakam, Raadhaamaadhavam), and Blessy's (Kaazhcha, Thanmaathra, the latter adapted from Padmarajan's short story Orma.

Film making
Padmarajan is celebrated for his unparalleled attention to detail in his screenplays. Most of his films portrayed human relationships and emotions. Many of his films have haunting climaxes, most of them not commonly portrayed in Malayalam movies. His characters are portrayed with sensitivity and intensity on the screen. The landscape is also the major part of the Padmarajan's craft in film making. His thesis were well crafted in his films. Padmarajan’s films explore the features of the landscape naturally.

Padmarajan's screenplays had such hitherto-unheard of features and subjects – such as casting rain as a character in Thoovanathumbikal (Dragonflies in the drizzle), homosexual love in Desatanakkili Karayarilla (Migratory Birds Don't Cry), unusual climax (by traditional standards) in Namukku Parkkan Munthiri Thoppukal (Vineyards for us to dwell) and Oridathoru Phayalvaan (There Lived a Wrestler). Forbidden love and characters that strive to rise above the limitations of middle-class Malayali society of the seventies and eighties is a recurring theme in many of his works. Many of his films bear the mark of his romanticism.

Personal life
Padmarajan's wife Radhalakshmi is from Chittur in Palakkad. Radhalakshmi was his colleague at AIR before their marriage in 1970. Radhalakshmi has written her reminiscences about him in her book Padmarajan Entaey Gandharvan (Padmarajan, my celestial lover). Their son, P. Ananthapadmanabhan, is a writer.

Padmarajan died suddenly at Hotel Paramount Towers in Calicut in the early hours of 24 January 1991, while he was visiting a cinema playing his last film Njan Gandharvan. The cause of death was a massive cardiac arrest.

Works

Novels
 Itha Ivide Vare
 Jalajwala
 Kallan Pavithran
 Manju Kaalam Notta Kuthira
 Nakshathrangale Kaaval
 Nanmakalude Sooryan
 Peruvazhiyambalam
 Prathimayum Rajakumariyum
 Rathinirvedam
 Rithubhedhangalude Paarithoshikam
 Shavavahanangalum Thedi
 Udakappola (Thoovanathumbikal)
 Vadakakku Oru Hridayam
 Vikramakaaleeswaram

Short stories
 Aparan ( Aparan)
 Avalude Katha
 Kariyilakkattu Pole (Kariyilakkattu Pole)
 Kaivariyude Thekkeyattam
 Kazhinja Vasantha Kalathil
 Lola
 Mattullavarude Venal
 Onnu Randu Moonnu
 Prahelika
 Pukakkannada
 Syphilisinte Nadakkavu
  Athirthi
  Jeevithacharya
  Choondal 
  Amritheth 
  Swayam 
  Mazha
  Mrithy 
  Oru Sthree Oru Purushan
  Kunju
  Shoorphanaka
  Kaikeyi
  Nisha Shalabham
  Banyan Avenue
  Orma
  Jeevithacharya
  Oru Sameepakaala Durantham
  Ningalude Thaavalangal Ningalkk
  Raanimaarude Kudumbam
  Ore Chandranmaar''''

 Films 

Awards

Kerala Sahithya Academy Awards
 1972: Novel – Nakshathrangale Kaval National Film Awards
 1979: Best Feature Film in Malayalam – Peruvazhiyambalam 1986: Best Feature Film in Malayalam – Thinkalaazhcha Nalla Divasam Filmfare Awards South
 1988: Filmfare Award for Best Director – Malayalam - Aparan Kerala State Film Awards
 1978: Best Story – Rappadikalude Gatha 1979: Second Best Film – Peruvazhiyambalam 1979: Best Story – Peruvazhiyambalam 1983: Best Film with Popular Appeal and Aesthetic Value – Koodevide 1984: Best Screenplay – Kanamarayathu 1988: Best Screenplay – Aparan Kerala Film Critics' Awards
 1977: Best Screenplay – Itha Ivide Vare 1982: Best Film – Novemberinte Nashtam 1983: Best Screenplay -Koodevide 1984: Best Screenplay – Kanamarayathu 1986: Best Screenplay – Namukku Parkkan Munthiri Thoppukal, Nombarathi Poovu 1988: Best Screenplay – Aparan, Moonnam Pakkam 1990: Best Screenplay – Innale Film Fans' Awards
 1975: Best Screenplay – Prayaanam 1977: Best Screenplay – Itha Ivide Vare 1978: Best Screenplay – Rappadikalude Gatha, Rathinirvedam 1980: Best Screenplay – Thakara Other awards
 1982: Kualalumpur Film Festival – Best Film – Oridathoru Phayalvaan 1982: Kualalumpur Film Festival – Best Script – Oridathoru Phayalvaan 1982: Gulf Award for Best Film – Novemberinte Nashtam 1983: Pournami Award for Best Director – Koodevide 1987: Film Chamber Award for Best Story – Thoovanathumbikal 1988: Film Fare Award for Best Director – Aparan 1990: Film Chamber Award for Best Story – Innale 1991: FAC award – Njan Gandharvan''

Padmarajan Award

Padmarajan Puraskaram or Padmarajan Award is an annual film/literary award instituted by the Padmarajan Memorial Trust. It carries a plaque and a cash award of  10,000. The award is given in two categories:

Padmarajan Award for Best Short Story
Padmarajan Award for Best Film

See also
 Malayalam cinema
 Bharathan

References

External links
 
 
cinemaofmalayalam.net
An excerpt from Padmarajan: Ente Gandharvan by Radhalakshmi (in Malayalam)
An article by Mathrubhumi during the silver jubilee of Aparan

1945 births
1991 deaths
Malayalam film directors
Film directors from Thiruvananthapuram
Malayalam-language writers
University College Thiruvananthapuram alumni
Kerala State Film Award winners
Malayalam novelists
Malayalam screenwriters
Recipients of the Kerala Sahitya Akademi Award
20th-century Indian novelists
Indian male screenwriters
20th-century Indian film directors
20th-century Indian short story writers
Indian male short story writers
People from Alappuzha district
Writers from Thiruvananthapuram
Screenwriters from Thiruvananthapuram
Novelists from Kerala
20th-century Indian male writers
20th-century Indian screenwriters
Malayalam film editors